John Stark (born 28 April 1948) is an Australian swimmer. He competed in the men's 200 metre butterfly at the 1964 Summer Olympics.

At the 1965 Maccabiah Games in Israel, he won a gold medal in the 200 m butterfly.

References

External links
 

1948 births
Living people
Australian male butterfly swimmers
Olympic swimmers of Australia
Swimmers at the 1964 Summer Olympics
Place of birth missing (living people)
Competitors at the 1965 Maccabiah Games
Maccabiah Games medalists in swimming
Maccabiah Games gold medalists for Australia
Jewish swimmers